The Sumba green pigeon (Treron teysmannii) is a species of bird in the family Columbidae. It is endemic to Sumba Island in Indonesia. Its natural habitat is subtropical or tropical moist lowland forests. It is threatened by habitat loss.

References

Sumba green pigeon
Birds of Sumba
Sumba green pigeon
Taxonomy articles created by Polbot